Sariwŏn Ch'ŏngnyŏn station is the central railway station of Sariwŏn, North Hwanghae province, North Korea. It is on located on the P'yŏngbu Line, which was formed from part of the Kyŏngŭi Line to accommodate the shift of the capital from Seoul to P'yŏngyang; though this line physically connects P'yŏngyang to Pusan via Dorasan, in operational reality it ends at Kaesŏng due to the Korean Demilitarized Zone. It is also the northern terminus of the Hwanghae Ch'ŏngnyŏn Line.

The station was opened in 1906, at the same time as the line itself. In 1945, when the division of Korea took place, Sariwŏn station became the end point of the North Korean section of the former Kyŏngŭi Line; however, at the end of the Korean War, with Kaesŏng becoming part of North Korea, the latter station became the terminus of the P'yŏngbu Line, as the line was renamed. It was given the current name, Sariwŏn Ch'ŏngnyŏn station, in 1974.

References

Railway stations in North Korea
Sariwon